The United States House of Representatives special election in Arkansas's 3rd congressional district was held on November 20, 2001 to select the successor to Asa Hutchinson who resigned upon appointment as director of the Drug Enforcement Administration.

Election results

References

Arkansas 3
Arkansas 2001
2001 special
Arkansas
United States House of Representatives
United States House of Representatives 2001 03
November 2001 events in the United States